Newark Rowing Club is a rowing club on the River Trent, based at Farndon Road, Newark, Nottinghamshire.

History
The club was founded in 1873 and runs teams for all age groups.

The club won a national title with the Thames Rowing Club in 2014 when the Open junior under-18 double sculls at the 2014 British Rowing Junior Championships. In 2019 a record 132 finishers competed in the club's annual Head Race.

British champions

References

Sport in Nottinghamshire
Rowing clubs in England
Rowing clubs of the River Trent
Newark-on-Trent